Krisztián Pest (born 7 June 1975 in Mohács) is a Hungarian football player who currently plays for SV Neumarkt/Pötting.

References

HLSZ
Hungary vs Estonia

1975 births
Living people
People from Mohács
Hungarian footballers
Association football midfielders
Hungary international footballers
Kaposvári Rákóczi FC players
Komlói Bányász SK footballers
Mohácsi TE footballers
BFC Siófok players
Újpest FC players
Pécsi MFC players
APOP Kinyras FC players
Nemzeti Bajnokság I players
Cypriot First Division players
Hungarian expatriate footballers
Expatriate footballers in Cyprus
Expatriate footballers in Austria
Hungarian expatriate sportspeople in Cyprus
Hungarian expatriate sportspeople in Austria
Sportspeople from Baranya County